

As of 2011 there were 102 listed buildings and structures in the English borough of Crawley, West Sussex.  Two others have subsequently gained listed status.  The Borough of Crawley is based on the town of the same name, located approximately halfway between London and Brighton.  Although Crawley expanded substantially after World War II when it was designated a New Town by an Act of Parliament, many older buildings remain.

In England, a building or structure is defined as "listed" when it is placed on a statutory register of buildings of "special architectural or historic interest" by the Secretary of State for Culture, Media and Sport, a Government department, in accordance with the Planning (Listed Buildings and Conservation Areas) Act 1990. Historic England, a non-departmental public body, acts as an agency of this department to administer the process and advise the department on relevant issues.  There are three grades of listing status: Grade I, defined as being of "exceptional interest"; Grade II*, "particularly important buildings of more than special interest"; and Grade II, used for buildings of "special interest".

Crawley has three buildings of Grade I status, 12 listed at Grade II* and 87 of Grade II status.  The three Grade I buildings are all places of worship, and churches and farmhouses feature frequently in the list.  Other structures given recognition by English Heritage include a signal box, a watermill, and the Beehive—a "revolutionary" purpose-built circular building which was the original passenger terminal at Gatwick Airport and the world's first fully integrated airport terminal.

The design of the New Town was based on a series of self-contained residential neighbourhoods around a town centre with commercial and civic buildings.  There are now 13 neighbourhoods in the town.  Pound Hill and Ifield, old villages absorbed by the postwar development, have 28 and 24 listed buildings respectively.  Northgate, which has 18, includes much of the town centre and the old High Street.  Langley Green, in which there are 15 listed buildings, is the largest neighbourhood with a large semi-rural hinterland.  Elsewhere, there are six listed buildings in West Green, two each in Bewbush and Southgate, and one in each of Broadfield, Gossops Green, Maidenbower, Three Bridges and Tilgate.  Furnace Green is the only neighbourhood with no listed buildings.

Crawley Borough Council maintains a list of all listed buildings.  Last updated in 2011, some of its information supersedes the older information carried by English Heritage's online archive, Images of England, which was compiled in February 2001 and which identifies 95 listed buildings in the borough.  An early-19th-century house called Charlwood Park, listed at Grade II on 11 November 1966, was originally within the parish of Charlwood in the county of Surrey.  The Local Government Act 1972, which moved parts of Surrey (including Lowfield Heath and Gatwick Airport) from Surrey into West Sussex, also moved this house into West Sussex and the Borough of Crawley.  It was subsequently demolished, but is still shown in the Images of England archive.  Buildings listed since the council's last update are Lowfield Hall, a house at Lowfield Heath, and the war memorial in the nearby church.

Listed buildings

See also
List of conservation areas in Crawley
List of places of worship in Crawley
Locally listed buildings in Crawley

Notes

References

Bibliography

Buildings and structures in Crawley
Listed buildings in West Sussex
Lists of listed buildings in West Sussex